Friedrich Fischer (March 19, 1849 – October 2, 1899) from Schweinfurt, Germany is considered the father of the modern ball bearing, having invented the process for milling standard bearings in 1883.

Biography
Fischer designed the ball grinding mill, a machine that allows steel balls to be ground to an absolutely round state in large volumes for the first time. Thanks to this innovation, he laid the foundation for the entire rolling bearing industry. Thus, the worldwide success story of the ball bearing begins in Schweinfurt.

Later, 1883 is officially declared the year in which the company was founded.

1890 - On July 17, Fischer received the patent for his ball grinding machine from the Kaiserliches Patentamt.
1895 - The UK Imperial Patent Office grants Fischer patent number 10925A for his ball grinding and milling machine.
1896 - Fischer applies for permission to build a new plant near the train station in Schweinfurt – a step towards a new industrial dimension. The new plant produces 10 million balls per week. The company is incorporated one year later.
1899 - Friedrich Fischer suffered a stroke and died at the age of 50 on October 2. He did not have any children. With the death of this innovator and entrepreneur, his 400 employees lost the driving force of the company. The company’s financial situation worsened. This was also due to the persisting crisis in the ball industry, which was caused by overproduction, competitive pressure, protective duties, etc.
1905 - On July 29, the FAG brand is registered with the patent office in Berlin. The registered trademark FAG, which stands for Fischers Aktien-Gesellschaft, is protected in over 100 countries today.

Legacy
Today the FAG brand is owned by the Schaeffler Group.

References

19th-century German inventors
1849 births
1899 deaths
German mechanical engineers
Engineers from Bavaria
People from Schweinfurt